Sudhhasatwa Basu (born 1963) is an Indian chemical engineer. He is director of Council of Scientific Industrial Research - Institute of Minerals and Materials Technology (CSIR-IMMT) in Bhubaneswar, India, and is Professor of Chemical Engineering, Indian Institute of Technology (IIT) Delhi, Adjunct Professor, Institute of Chemical Technology, Mumbai and Professor of AcSIR. His research interests include electrokinetic and electrochemical phenomena in fuel cells.

Early life and education 
Suddhasatwa Basu was born on 5 January 1963. He completed a B.Tech from University of Calcutta in 1987 and a Ph.D. from Indian Institute of Science, Bangalore in 1993 in Chemical Engineering.

Career 
He worked as postdoctoral research fellow & visiting faculty in the department of Chemical & Material Engineering at University of Alberta, Edmonton, Canada (1994 –1997). He also worked on oil sands extraction technology at the University of Alberta and closely involved in various projects.

In 1998 after completion of his research, he joined IIT Delhi, New Delhi as assistant professor in the Department of Chemical Engineering.

He is Professor (Higher Academic Grade), IIT Delhi, where he worked as Head of the Chemical Engineering Department from 2012 to 2015 and Associate Dean of R&D, IIT Delhi from 2016 to 2017.

Currently he is the Director of Council of Scientific Industrial Research - Institute of Minerals and Materials Technology (CSIR-IMMT) since 2018 (on lien from IIT Delhi) with Professor, Faculty of Engineering Sciences, AcSIR and Adjunct Professor (since 2019) in the Department of Chemical Engineering at Institute of Chemical Technology, Mumbai.

He was visiting Professor at the University of Alberta, Canada in 2000 and 2002, University of Newcastle, Australia 2005, University Karlsruhe (KIT), Germany 2006 and University of Newcastle upon Tyne, UK 2008 and 2010. His broad research interests are in the area of Interfacial and Electrochemical Engineering and their application in hydrogen energy and fuel cell technology. He has addressed the issues coming out of the nexus between energy and the environment. His works on development of direct alcohol and glucose PEM and AEM Fuel Cells, PEMFC diagnostics, solid oxide fuel cells, as the source of renewable energy sources and removal ionic dyes from water by reverse micelles selectively, reuse of dye and solvent, CO2 conversion to chemical fuels and dye mineralization by photocatalysis, as environmentally benign technologies.

He has published more than 180 articles in high impact factor journals, 28 conferences, and 8 patents. He won the Herdillia Award in 2016 and FITT award for best thesis at IIT Delhi in Chemical Engineering.

Honors 

He is a visiting fellow of Royal Society, UK, DAAD fellow, UKIERI award, Distinguish Alumni Award from Chemical Engineering Department, Calcutta University, FITT award for best thesis at IIT Delhi.

Prof. R. D. Desai 80th Birthday Commemoration Medal & Prize, 2012, Indian Chemical Society; Fellow of the Indian Chemical Society, 2012
 Fellow of Institute of Engineers, 2011
 FITT award for best M.Tech. / Ph.D. thesis 2010; prize money shared with student A. Awasthi
 Visiting Fellow, Royal Society, UK, University of Newcastle upon Tyne, UK, 2008
 Fellow of National Academy Sciences of India
 Fellow of Royal Society of Chemistry, UK.

Editor / Editorial Board Member 

 Editor in chief, Indian Chemical Engineer, quarterly Journal of Indian Institute of Chemical Engineers, 2018 – present (former Editor, 2006–2007); published by Taylor & Francis UK

Research interests 

 Electrochemical storage and renewable energy sources: materials and device development of PEMFC, DAFC, DGFC, SOFC, SOEC, Hydrogen generation – PEM electrolyzer and photochemical water splitting, Li-, Na- ion battery, super-capacitors and their application in portable electronic equipment and rural electrification in the off grid area.
 Interfacial & electro-chemical engineering and micro-fluid mechanics and their application in micro fuel cell, bio-sensing,  reduction to chemical fuels, dye removal from water by reverse micelles and reuse, dye mineralization by photo-catalysis and their application to rural sectors.

Selected bibliography

Books 

 Arya Das, Suddhasatwa Basu, Mamata Mohapatra, Transition Metal Oxalates as Potential Futuristic Materials for Efficient Energy Storage Capacity in Oxalate: Structure, Functions and Occurrence, Nova Science Publishers (2020)
 Surya Kanta Das, Shivakumar I. Angadi, Tonmoy Kundu, and Suddhasatwa Basu, Mineral Processing of Rare Earth Ores, Ch 2, in Rare-Earth Metal Recovery for Green Technologies Methods and Applications, Ed. Rajesh Kumar Jyothi, Springer (2020)
 Neetu Kumari, M. Ali Haider and Suddhasatwa Basu, Mechanism of Catalytic and Electrocatalytic  Reduction to Fuels and Chemicals (Chapter 2) in Electrochemical Reduction of Carbon Dioxide: Fundamentals and Technologies, Ed. Jinli Qiao, Yuyu Liu, Jiujun Zhang, CRC Press 2016
 Suddhasatwa Basu, Proton Exchange Membrane Fuel Cell Technology: India's Perspective in Energy Material, in Science Based Technologies for Sustainable and Adequate Energy for India, Ed. I. Manna, B. Raj, K. Mudali, Proc Indian Natn Sci Acad 81(4), September 2015 pp. 865–890
 S. Basu (Ed.), Recent Trends in Fuel Cell Science and Technology, Springer, New York (2007) (apart from editing the book contributed two chapters)
 Basu, S., Report on Challenges in Fuel cell Technology: India's Perspective, Dec 1 & 2, 2006, New Delhi (DST)

References

External links 
 

Fellows of the Indian National Science Academy
1963 births
Living people
Indian chemical engineers
Academic staff of IIT Delhi
IIT Delhi